Jermaine Hall (born November 24, 1980) is an American professional basketball player who last played for Maccabi Ashdod of the Israeli Basketball Premier League. He played college basketball for Wagner College.

College career
Hall led the Wagner Seahawks men's basketball to the NCAA Tournament where he won the NEC Player of the Year, All-NEC First Team, was the NEC Tournament MVP and made the NEC All-Tournament Team.

Professional career
After graduating from Wagner College in 2003, he tried out for several teams in the USA before moving to Europe. After competing in Portugal he spent the past twelve seasons in Israel competing in both the first and second divisions. Was playing for Maccabi Ashdod. Currently plays for Nof HaGalil's basketball team, Hapoel Nof HaGalil, which plays in the IBA fourth tier, Liga Alef. Hall is coaching in the young and youth club of Hapoel Nof HaGalil.

References

1980 births
Living people
American expatriate basketball people in Israel
American expatriate basketball people in Poland
American expatriate basketball people in Portugal
American men's basketball players
AZS Koszalin players
Basketball players from Georgia (U.S. state)
Forwards (basketball)
Hapoel Afula players
Hapoel Gilboa/Afula players
Ironi Ashkelon players
Maccabi Ashdod B.C. players
People from Dublin, Georgia
Wagner Seahawks men's basketball players